Hemidactylus flaviviridis is a species of gecko. It is known as the yellow-belly gecko or northern house gecko.

Distribution
Its range includes Egypt (Ismailia, Sinai), Saudi Arabia, Qatar, Oman, Iraq, Iran, Afghanistan, Bangladesh, Nepal, Pakistan, India, Argentina, Socotra Island (Yemen), N Somalia, Sudan, Ethiopia, and Eritrea. The type locality is Insel Massaua, Abessinien.e

References
 Anderson, J. 1871 A list of the reptilian accession to the Indian Museum, Calcutta, from 1865 to 1870, with a description of some new species. J. Asiat. Soc. Bengal, Calcutta, 40, part 11(1): 12–39.
 Gray, J. E. 1842 Description of some new species of Reptiles, chiefly from the British Museum collection. The Zoological Miscellany: 57–59.
 Mahendra, B. C. 1935 Sexual dimorphism in the Indian House-gecko Hemidactylus flaviviridis Ruppel. Current Science Bangalore 4, 178–179.
 Rüppell, E. 1835 Neue Wirbelthiere zu der Fauna von Abyssinien gehörig, entdeckt und beschrieben. Amphibien. S. Schmerber, Frankfurt a. M.

External links
 
 http://itgmv1.fzk.de/www/itg/uetz/herp/photos/Hemidactylus_flaviviridis.jpg 
 http://itgmv1.fzk.de/www/itg/uetz/herp/photos/Hemidactylus_flaviviridis2.jpg

Hemidactylus
Reptiles of Pakistan
Reptiles described in 1835